The 1994–95 Northern Football League season was the 97th in the history of Northern Football League, a football competition in England.

Division One

Division One featured 17 clubs which competed in the division last season, along with three new clubs, promoted from Division Two:
 Bedlington Terriers
 Peterlee Newtown
 Prudhoe East End, who also changed name to Prudhoe Town

Also, Newcastle Blue Star changed name to RTM Newcastle.

League table

Division Two

Division Two featured 16 clubs which competed in the division last season, along with four new clubs.
 Clubs relegated from Division One:
 Brandon United
 Stockton
 Plus:
 Harltepool Town, joined from the Wearside Football League
 Morpeth Town, joined from the Northern Football Alliance

League table

References

External links
 Northern Football League official site

Northern Football League seasons
1994–95 in English football leagues